"Mini Kawoulé" is the second single by Jessy Matador, from his debut album Afrikan New Style. It was released on 2 February 2008 in France and peaked at number 16 in the French Singles Chart. As of May 2011 it has had over 8.8 million hits on YouTube.

Track listing
iTunes Digital download
"Mini Kawoulé" – 3:16
"Mini Kawoulé" (Music Video) – 3:10

CD single
"Mini Kawoulé" – 3:16
"Offset Gwada"
"Selesao"
"Mini Kawoulé"

Chart performance

Release history

References

2009 singles
2009 songs